= Edwina Streeter Dixon =

African American short story writer (1907-2002)

- Born: 1907; Chicago, Illinois
- Died: 2002 (aged 94–95)
- Occupation: Author
- Spouse: Albert Dixon

Edwina Streeter Dixon (1907–2002) was a short story writer.

Her most notable short story is "Pa Sees Again," which was published in the Afro-American and the anthology Best Short Stories By Afro-American Writers (1925-1950).

== Biography ==
Edwina Streeter was born in 1907 in Chicago, and the census notes she was "mulatto." According to the census, her father's name was illegible and was from Tennessee. Her mother's name was Abigail and was from Ohio. She had two sisters, Gloria and Georgia.

The 1930 census notes that she had married Albert Dixon, and had a daughter, Joyce.

== Published works ==
- Dixon, Edwina Streeter. "Call it social security." in ed. Musser, J. (2011). "Girl, colored" and other stories: A complete short fiction anthology of African American women writers in The crisis magazine, 1910-2010. McFarland & Co., Publishers. ISBN 9780786446063
